Maurice E Megennis (16 November 1929 – 4 August 2020) was a male weightlifter who competed for England.

Weightlifting career
He competed in the 1952 and 1956 Olympic Games.

He represented England in the -56 kg division at the 1950 British Empire Games in Auckland, New Zealand. Four years later he won the gold medal for England at the 1954 British Empire and Commonwealth Games.

Personal life
He was born in London but lived in Leeds.

References

1929 births
English male weightlifters
Weightlifters at the 1950 British Empire Games
Weightlifters at the 1954 British Empire and Commonwealth Games
Commonwealth Games medallists in weightlifting
Commonwealth Games gold medallists for England
Olympic weightlifters of Great Britain
Weightlifters at the 1952 Summer Olympics
Weightlifters at the 1956 Summer Olympics
2020 deaths
Medallists at the 1954 British Empire and Commonwealth Games